The Ontario Arts Foundation is a non-governmental not for profit organization established in 1991 under the Ontario Corporations Act to encourage and facilitate private giving to the arts in Ontario, Canada. The group is distinct from the Ontario Arts Council, which administers public funding for Ontario Artists and arts organizations.

Operation 
The Foundation assists the Ontario Arts Council by assisting with private funding of the arts and oversees 350 endowments established by individuals, foundations, corporations and arts organizations. 

In 2022, it had $100 million in assets and disbursements of over $5.8 million using a staff of two and a board of 15.

Programs 
The Foundation manages three programs, the Arts Endowment Fund Program, the Canada Cultural Investment Fund, Endowment Incentives Component, and the Private Funds, Awards, Scholarships.

List of private funds, awards and scholarships administered by the Ontario Arts Foundation:

 Louis Applebaum Composers Award
 Laura Ciruls Painting Fund
 Virginia and Myrtle Cooper Award in Costume Design
 William and Mary Corcoran Craft Awards
 K.M. Hunter Artist Awards
 Douglas James Dales Fund
 Christopher Dedrick Fund
 Paul de Hueck and Norman Walford Career Achievement Awards
 Hal Jackman Fund
 Mary Jolliffe Award for Senior Arts Administrators 
 Hugh D. McKellar Fund
 Kathleen McMorrow Music Award
 Ontario Arts Foundation Artist Educator Award
 Orford String Quartet Fund
 Philip Akin – Black Shoulders Legacy Award
 Christina and Louis Quilico Awards
 Ruth & Sylvia Schwartz Children's Book Awards
 Ellen Ross Stuart Opening Doors Awards
 Tafelmusik, Horst Dantz and Don Quick Endowed Fund
 Tim Sims Encouragement Fund Award
 Le Fonds Héritage Richard – Vaillancourt Legacy Fund
 Gina Wilkinson Prize for an Emerging Female Director
 Wuchien Michael Than Fund

See also 

 Ontario Art Council

References

Culture of Ontario
1991 establishments in Ontario